Viorica Cortez (born 26 December 1935) is a noted Romanian-born mezzo-soprano, later French by naturalisation. Starting her operatic and concert career in the mid-1960s, she went on to become one of the most prominent female performers of the '70s and '80s. An example of professional longevity, she is present on some of the most prestigious European opera scenes.

Early life 
With a well-determined Spanish origin, Viorica Cortez is the eldest sister of the soprano Mioara Cortez, and of Ștefania Șerban, a professor of piano. She was born in Bucium, a village in the vicinity (nowadays a neighbourhood) of Iași. Cortez enjoyed an artistic milieu in her parents' house, finding her passion and intense desire of studying music. Later on, she was admitted to the Iași Conservatory and, for her final three years of academic studies, she switched to Bucharest's Ciprian Porumbescu Conservatory. In Iași, at only 17, Cortez made her debut in the alto part of Beethoven's Ninth Symphony. She then toured the towns of Moldavia for years, almost exclusively in vocal-symphonical repertoire.

Studies and international recognition 
In Bucharest, Viorica Cortez was the student of Arta Florescu, a post-war Romanian soprano and professor (besides Cortez, some of her important apprentices were Marina Krilovici, Eugenia Moldoveanu, Maria Slătinaru-Nistor, Leontina Văduva and even Angela Gheorghiu). She vividly encouraged the young mezzo-soprano to consider international competitions. Cortez took her advice and applied for the International "George Enescu" Contest in Bucharest (1964), where she ranked only fourth. The same year, she won the International Singing Contest in Toulouse, along with Romanian fellow tenor Ludovic Spiess. In Le Monde, the well-known critic Jacques Lonchampt praised her dark, velvety mezzo, her artistry and technique, as well as her glittering beauty on the stage. This victory at Toulouse was immediately followed by a contract in the city's noted Théâtre du Capitole for the year to come. In the final gala, Cortez sang Leonora's aria from Donizetti's La favorita, which was to become one of her signature concert and recital pieces.

Also in 1964, Cortez graduated from the Bucharest Conservatory, making her debut in a staged opera production - Gluck's Orphée et Eurydice. Next year, she won the Great "Kathleen Ferrier" Prize at the International Vocal Competition 's-Hertogenbosch. She made her debut in Saint-Saëns' Samson et Dalila opposite Ludovic Spiess in Cluj and then in Toulouse the same year, and she returned as Carmen one year later.  Cortez then established herself as one of the most respected and recognized young Romanian opera singers, though in her native country she appeared mostly in concerts and recitals. After being hired by the Romanian National Opera in Bucharest in 1967, this changed, as she toured the country and Europe (the former Yugoslavia, France, Greece and especially Ireland), making her debut in Ambroise Thomas' Mignon, Giuseppe Verdi's Don Carlo, Aida and Il trovatore, Gaetano Donizetti's La Favorita and Jules Massenet's Werther.

In 1967, she won the Grand Prize and the Golden Medal of the International "George Enescu" Contest in Bucharest, ending her competition itinerary. Already an established name in Romania, she toured France alongside Arta Florescu (in Aida) and made her Chorégies d'Orange debut (as Amneris from Aida). The same year, she auditioned for the first and only time in her career for Sir Georg Solti, who was looking for a Carmen in the London Royal Opera House's new production. Apparently, after hearing Cortez, he declared: "This IS the Carmen we've been looking for. We found HER". Her debut came in 1968 and, although the critics were not unanimously favorable to her, the performances were hailed as one of the season's most notable events. For Cortez, that meant not only the launching in a new dimension of her professional career, but also an encounter with Sandor Gorlinsky, the agent who added her to his star-studded roster.

More capital debuts came. While maintaining a particular relationship with French opera houses (Toulouse, Rouen, Bordeaux, Avignon, Nice) and still a member of the Bucharest Opera, Cortez sang her first performances in Barcelona (Gran Teatre del Liceu, La favorita, 1969), Vienna (Staatsoper, Don Carlo, 1969), Salzburger Festspiele (Carmen, 1969), Naples (Teatro di San Carlo, Norma and Aida opposite Leyla Gencer), and Paris (Grand Opera, Carmen, 1970).

1970s career 
By 1970, Cortez was being considered by virtually every major opera house, but for a Romanian artist, getting out of the country was a major challenge, often insurmountable. The lack of a passport and endless difficulties with the authorities were obstacles not only for her, but for every Romanian performer who hoped for an international career. Many contracts were annulled because of this issue. In the winter of 1970, Viorica Cortez was in Naples for a series of performances of Samson et Dalila opposite Mario del Monaco. She did not return to Romania, deciding to continue her artistic destiny abroad and for quite some time was separated from her family members and friends.

Cortez's American debut occurred in 1970. She performed in Philadelphia, Pittsburgh, then finally New York, where she first appeared alongside Martina Arroyo in Verdi's Messa da Requiem in Carnegie Hall. Both La Scala and the Metropolitan scheduled her, the first in Samson et Dalila, the other in Carmen. In Milan, succeeding Shirley Verrett's Dalila, Cortez was asked by the opera management and conductor Georges Pretre to consider an extra performance, an exceptional decision of the theatre following the enormous success of her first appearance with the house. In New York, Richard Tucker, her Don Jose for the debut night, hailed her as one of the most attractive and convincing Carmens he has ever sung with.

From then on, Cortez's career covered every major opera house in the world. Claudio Abbado invited her for the Verdi Requiem at La Scala, along with Plácido Domingo and Nicolai Ghiaurov. The celebrated Bulgarian bass was her partner for Massenet's freshly revived opera, Don Quichotte, both in Paris and Chicago, the Parisian mise en scène being assigned to Peter Ustinov. In Chicago, Cortez was a commanding and electrifying Elisabetta in Maria Stuarda opposite Montserrat Caballé (1973). The friendship and mutual respect between the two divas represented a milestone in Cortez's career. For Norma and Maria Stuarda, as well as for Don Carlo and Il Trovatore, the Catalan soprano and the Romanian mezzo-soprano were scheduled together in Lisbon, Naples, Nice, Vienna, Cologne, Madrid and La Scala (Norma, 1974) and at the Met (Il Trovatore, 1973).

In 1972, Viorica Cortez acceded to the Arena di Verona "hall of fame", interpreting Amneris opposite the Radames of Franco Corelli. In the following years, she would become a favourite of the notoriously picky audience of what is Italy's most demanding opera festival.

In 1975, having become a French citizen, she returned to her long-missed Bucharest for a recital at the Atheneum.

Cortez felt at home both in the Italian and French repertoire. She portrayed a rapturous Dalila (Teatro Sao Carlos, Lisabona - 1975, Grand Opera, Paris - 1978), a powerful, intense Azucena (Metropolitan, New York - 1973, 1977, 1978, Grand Opera, Paris - 1975, Staatsoper, Vienna - 1973, 1974, 1976, Teatro alla Scala, Milan - 1978), a fragile Charlotte in Massenet's Werther, almost always with Alfredo Kraus, who named her his "absolute favourite Charlotte", a dramatic Eboli, notably in Vienna, Bordeaux, Lisbon, Bilbao and for La Scala Bicentennial - 1978, a delicate and interiorised Marguerite in Berlioz's La Damnation de Faust (Paris, Verona), and a sovereign and shining Amneris (La Scala, Milan - 1973, Arena di Verona - 1977, Metropolitan, New York - 1979).

Nevertheless, her repertory widened every year. She was a shockingly tempestuous Klitemnestra in Richard Strauss' Elektra opposite Birgit Nillson (Rome, 1971). She felt no boundaries or shyness in jumping from one composer to another, mixing Monteverdi (L'Incoronazione di Poppea, Naples, 1976) with Giordano (Fedora, Bologna, 1977), Stravinsky (Oedipus Rex, La Scala, Milan, 1972, 1973, 1980) with Mussorgsky (Boris Godunov, Paris, 1980), Rossini (Tancredi, Martina Franca, 1976) with Lalo (Le Roi d'Ys, Nancy, 1979).

Career of the 1980s 
During the 1970s, Viorica Cortez went from one opera to another, across the world, singing Dalila in Paris one day, Azucena in Milan the next, and Giulietta in Chicago the following week. This intensity was about to take its toll.

At the beginning of the '80s, Cortez's voice seemed to be slowly but surely deteriorating. Critiques and objections became more and more frequent. Still, as the contracts were signed five years in advance, she had to sing. She was forced to cancel some L'Hérodiade performances in Avignon, some others in Marseille, and she searched for support besides her family and her vocal trainer. Recovering, she returned to the stage after a couple of months, more cautious, more balanced, decided to abandon the tremendous turmoil of the past. She became quite selective in arranging her schedule. For almost four years, she was rarely in Europe, due to her long-term Metropolitan engagements (Samson et Dalila - 1981, Il Trovatore, Les Contes d'Hoffmann, Adriana Lecouvreur - 1982, 1983, 1984). She starred in some, star-directed productions in Paris (Nabucco, alongside Grace Bumbry and Sherrill Milnes - 1979, Jorge Lavelli's Oedipus Rex - 1979, Joseph Losey's Boris Godunov - 1980 or Sonja Frissell's Un ballo in maschera, alongside José Carreras - 1981).

In 1984, she was a vehement Klitemnestra in Regina Resnik's San Francisco Opera production of Elektra. She sang in Denver, Rio de Janeiro, Madrid, Bagdad, Tokyo, Osaka, and Amsterdam, but she also returned to stages such as L'Arena di Verona (La Gioconda and Aida - 1988), Grand Opera, Paris (Herodias in Richard Strauss' Salome in the fascinating mise-en-scene of her dear Jorge Lavelli), Gran Teatre del Liceu, Barcelona (Il Trovatore, La Gioconda, Les Contes d'Hoffmann, Il Matrimonio Segreto - 1986, 1987, 1988, 1989), Teatro Comunale di Bologna (Un Ballo in maschera with Luciano Pavarotti - 1989). Still in 1989, she awed Paris, this time as La Star in Zygmund Krause's eponymous opera, directed by Jorge Lavelli. The former editor in chief of Opera International, Sergio Segalini, called her "diva assolutta".

Basis for a new career: the 1990s
From the middle of the 1980s, Cortez, extremely conscious of the status of an artist of her calibre, started to abandon the prima donna roles in favour of more mature, real-life and age correspondent parts. She sang her last Eboli in 1982, her last Giulietta and Dalila in 1987, and her last Amneris in 1988. For someone who had been hailed "the most beautiful mezzo-soprano in the world" it required refinement and elegance to maintain that image. She then alternated her signature roles with the ones that would become the landmarks of her new repertoire: La Cieca in La Gioconda (Verona, Barcelona), Madame Flora in Menotti's Medium (Paris, Catania), Zia Principessa in Suor Angelica (Nice, Madrid, Bilbao, Lisbon), La Marquise de Berkenfield in La Fille du Regiment (Torino, Oviedo, Madrid, Monte-Carlo, Strasbourg), Anaide in Leoncavallo's Zaza (Palermo), Ulrica in Un Ballo in maschera (Barcelona, Genova), Madame de Croissy in "Les Dialogues des Carmelites" (Avignon, Vichy), Quickly in "Falstaff" (Bordeaux, Buenos Aires, Hamburg). Her acting abilities, as well as the richness of her voice, made her a sought after mezzo for composition roles (character roles), a trend she followed for the next decade of her career.

Equally important, Cortez was able to sing in her native country again, after 20 years of exile. She appeared in numerous benefit galas and concerts and gave recitals in Bucharest and Iasi, as well as opera performances ("Carmen" in Iasi - 1991, "Il Trovatore" at the National Opera in Bucharest - 1992).

The 2000s 
At the beginning of 2001, coming from Iaşi, the car her husband was driving crashed violently into a tree, killing the driver and seriously hurting the mezzo-soprano. After almost six months of recovery, she returned to the stage (La Comtesse de Coigny and Madelon in Giordano's Andrea Chénier in Seville), determined to pursue her career. Her comeback was emotionally highlighted by the Spanish press. Subsequently, as a confirmation of the very special relationship between the singer and the Spanish audience, she concentrated most of her career in Barcelona, Madrid, Sevilla, and Bilbao, without neglecting offers from Italy or France. At the Gran Teatre del Liceu, she added to her repertoire a role she had been dreaming of since the 80s: The Old Countess from Tchaikovsky's The Queen of Spades, which she reprised in Madrid (Teatro Real, 2004). She later sang Buryovka in Janáček's Jenůfa in Barcelona (2005), where she also opened the 2007-2008 season as la Comtesse/Madelon. Again in 2008, Viorica Cortez made her return to the Monte-Carlo Opera (Starenka Buryovka in Janáček's Jenůfa). She also reprised one of her best recent characters, Madame de Croissy, in Les Dialogues des Carmelites, for the opening of the 2008-2009 season at Teatro Campoamor in Oviedo, in the famed production of Robert Carsen. The performances were highly acclaimed by the press. Later on, she was to debut with Teatro del Maggio in Florence (Cavalleria rusticana). In 2009, Viorica Cortez starred in the creation of a new opera (Une affaire etrangere) in Montpellier. Cortez is scheduled to return on stage in Cavalleria Rusticana for the 2010-2011 season of the Marseille Opera.

Carmen 
"Carmen du siecle" - this is what the French press was headlining in the 1970s. Without any doubt, Cortez was one of the most sought-after Carmens of the 1970s and '80s. She sang the opera 278 times, more than Gianna Pederzini or Giulietta Simionato, and since her big Covent Garden break (1968), she relentlessly deepened the character, almost identifying herself with Mérimée's and Bizet's heroine. The critics applauded her creamy, very extended voice, able to cover all three registers, her exquisite technique, her refinement in the French way of punctuating, as well as her breathtaking beauty and charisma on stage. With Carmen, Viorica Cortez entered the exclusive club of opera stars. She sang the role at La Scala (1972, with Giuseppe di Stefano), Metropolitan Opera (1971, 1979), Royal Opera House, Covent Garden (1968, 1969, 1974), Grand Opera, Paris (1970), Staatsoper, Vienna (1970, 1971, 1973, 1976), Arena di Verona (1975, 1980), but also in Bordeaux, Marseille, Nice, Salzburg, Bilbao, Oviedo, Rome, Trieste, Bologna, Chicago, Naples, Toulouse, Beograd, Piacenza, Rio de Janeiro, Pistoia, Montreal, Lille, Avignon, Málaga, Genova, Philadelphia, Strasbourg, San Antonio, Seattle, Lisbon, Messina, Lausanne, Bucharest, etc. Her last "Carmen" was in her native Iaşi, in 1991.

Discography 
Viorica Cortez arrived in Western Europe when all the major recording labels had exclusive contracts with more famous mezzo-sopranos. Thus, Cortez had to content herself with sporadic recordings. The first international one, made for EMI France, was maybe another missed step: Mercedes in "Carmen" alongside Grace Bumbry, Jon Vickers, Mirella Freni and Kostas Paskalis, under the baton of Raphael Fruhbeck de Burgos. By that time, Cortez had already sung the role at Covent Garden and all over France, being a demanded Carmen herself. She then had the chance of recording Azucena in Il Trovatore with Bruno Bartoletti and Maddalena in Rigoletto with Francesco Molinari-Pradelli, both operas being filmed for German television. A celebrated recording was that of Il Cappello di Paglia di Firenze by the world-famous film music composer Nino Rota. In 1977, Cortez recorded in Luxembourg her one and only aria recital, which won the Grand Prize of Académie Lyrique du Disque in France. It was later released as a CD. The lack of official recordings kept Cortez one step behind her illustruous colleagues Fiorenza Cossotto, Grace Bumbry, Shirley Verrett or Elena Obraztsova. Fortunately, the last decade brought a flourishing of in-house live recordings: Oberto, conte di San Bonifacio (Bologna, 1977), Aida (Vienna, 1973, Denver, 1986), Elektra (Rome, 1971), Norma (Naples, 1973, Caracas, 1975), Maria Stuarda (Chicago, 1973), Il trovatore (Paris 1975, New York 1978, 1981), La favorita (Genova, 1976), Don Carlo (Milan, 1978), Adriana Lecouvreur (New York, 1983), Gioconda (Verona, 1988), Suor Angelica (Madrid, 1993), Zaza (Palermo, 1994), La fille du régiment" (Madrid, 1996), Les contes d'Hoffmann (Orange, 2002), Jenůfa (Barcelona, 2005).

Personal life 
Viorica Cortez was married three times: first, to the Romanian sculptor Marcel Guguianu, then to the French composer Emmanuel Bondeville, former manager of the Paris Opera and Opéra Comique, and finally to the Romanian-born historian Adolf Armbruster. From the first marriage, the singer has one daughter - Catalina.

References

Sources 
 Adolf Armbruster - "Viorica Cortez. Enciclopedia unei cariere", Editura Enciclopedica, Bucuresti, 1994
 Metropolitan Opera, Viorica Cortez performance record, MetOpera Database
 Alain Pâris, Le dictionnaire des interprètes, Éditions Robert Laffont, 1989. 

1935 births
Living people
National University of Music Bucharest alumni
Romanian emigrants to France
20th-century Romanian women opera singers
Romanian operatic mezzo-sopranos
Musicians from Iași
Romanian people of Spanish descent
Naturalized citizens of France